Niklas Sivelov (born 11 April 1968) is a Swedish concert pianist, composer and teacher.

Biography

Niklas Sivelov was born in Skellefteå in Northern Sweden. His ancestors came from Karelia and Northern Finland.

Sivelov began studying the organ at age of 6 and later winning prizes throughout Scandinavia as an organist, mostly with his own compositions and improvisations. At the age fourteen he switched to piano and he began to practice more seriously. At seventeen, Sivelov attended the Royal College of music in Stockholm, where he studied keyboard and composition, and he made his soloist debut with the Royal Stockholm Philharmonic performing the Bartók Second Piano Concerto in 1991. He continued his studies in Helsinki, Bucharest, Trossingen and London. His repertoire extends from Bach to Contemporary, including a number of Swedish composers. His performance collaborations with conductors include, among others, Esa-Pekka Salonen, Leif Segerstam, Thomas Dausgaard, Jukka Pekka Saraste, Kees Bakels, Alan Gilbert, Paavo Berglund, Mario Venzago, John Axelrod and Kazufumi Yamashita. He has performed with the leading orchestras in Scandinavia, Tonhalle Zurich, Suisse Romande and orchestras all over Europe.

Niklas Sivelöv is a dedicated chamber musician. He gives recitals in prestigious venues all over the world and has worked together with Mark Peskanov, Leonid Gorokhov, Martin Fröst, Patrick Gallois and Malena Ernman and, showing another side of his versatility, he has performed and recorded with accordionist Lelo Nika.

Few pianists have the courage and stamina to perform Bach's Das Wohltemperierte Klavier book 1 and 2 in three concerts, as Niklas Sivelöv has done with success in legendary Bargemusic, New York in January 2010.

The distinctions Niklas Sivelöv has received are many and impressive signifying his position as leading Scandinavian pianist. His recording of his own improvisations over Bellman's music was awarded the important The Independent Music Awards, where he was the first Scandinavian ever won the prize for the best classical album and was elected Winner of Vox Populi poll, a component of the 8th IMA program. Former winners include names like Norah Jones, Tom Waits and Peter Gabriel. Niklas Sivelöv was recently elected for the Steinway Hall of Fame.

He has received the Diapason d'Or (Berwald's Piano Concerto), Cannes nomination for best 20th century recording (Einar Englund's Piano Concerto No.1) and Penguin Record Guide's highest marks (Piano works by Wilhelm Stenhammar and Wilhelm Peterson-Berger). Sivelöv has recently released the recording of Robert Schumann's Piano Sonatas and Stenhammar's two Piano Concertos with Malmö Symphony Orchestra.

Niklas Sivelöv is professor at the Royal Academy of Music in Copenhagen.

Discography
J.S Bach, 3 Sonatas for cello and piano with Morten Zeuthen
J.S. Bach Das Wohltemperierte Klavier
Niklas Sivelov  Works for piano 24 Preludes a.o.
Exposé Improvisations for 1&2 pianos
Schumann Piano Sonatas
Vers la flamme, music of A.N Skrjabin
Improvisational 1, piano improvisations inspired by C M Bellman
Piano Music of Argentina, Music by Ginastera, Piazzolla and Guastavino
Wilhelm Stenhammar: Piano Works
Danzas, Music for tuba and piano with Oystein Baadsvik
Franz Berwald: Piano Concerto in D major
Swedish Piano Music, Music by Morales, Seymer, Milveden, Rangström a.o.
Wlodek Gulgowski, works for piano
W. Peterson-Berger, Flowers from Frösö Island (Melodies, Humoresques and Idylls for Piano)
Wilhelm Stenhammar: The 2 concertos for piano
Einar Englund – Orchestral Works: Blackbird Symphony; Nostalgic Symphony; Piano Concerto
R. Schumann – Piano Works: Kreisleriana, Sonata G Minor, Arabesk and Variations, Op. 14
Liszt: Pianotranscriptions of Symphonies Nos. 1 and 3 (Eroica) by Beethoven
Lars Ekström: The Dream Age-Concerto, dedicated to Niklas Sivelöv
Fratres with Szymon Krzeszowiec, violin; music by Pärt, Reger, Stravinsky, Dallapiccola and Schnittke

Compositions

References
The Royal Academy of Music in Copenhagen
Naxos
IMA (Independent Music Awards)

External links
Nordic Artists Management

1968 births
Living people
People from Skellefteå Municipality
Swedish classical composers
Swedish male classical composers
Swedish classical pianists
Male classical pianists
21st-century classical pianists
21st-century Swedish male musicians